John Sargent (1750 – 9 September 1831) was a British Member of Parliament and administrator.

He was born a younger son of John Sargent, MP of Halstead Place, Kent and educated at Eton College (1760–67) and St. John’s College, Cambridge (1767) before studying law at Lincoln's Inn from 1770.

He held a wide variety of offices: Director of the Bank of England (1778–79), Gentleman of the Privy Chamber (1784), member of the Board of Agriculture (1803), Clerk of the Ordnance (1793–1802), joint Secretary to the Treasury (1802–1804) and a Commissioner of Audit (1806–21).

He also served as Member of Parliament for Seaford from 1790 to 1793, for Queenborough from 1794 to 1802 and for Bodmin from 1802 to 1806.

In 1778 he married Charlotte, the daughter and heiress of Richard Bettsworth of Petworth, Sussex, with whom he had 6 sons and 4 daughters, including John Sargent, the clergyman and biographer.

References

1750 births
1831 deaths
People educated at Eton College
Alumni of St John's College, Cambridge
Gentlemen of the Privy Chamber
Members of the Parliament of Great Britain for English constituencies
British MPs 1790–1796
British MPs 1796–1800
Members of the Parliament of the United Kingdom for English constituencies
UK MPs 1801–1802
UK MPs 1802–1806
Members of the Parliament of the United Kingdom for constituencies in Cornwall